{{Infobox organization
| name                = Technology Student Association
| image               = Technology_Student_Association_Emblem.svg
| image_border        = 
| size                = 
| caption             = 
| map                 = 
| msize               = 
| mcaption            = 
| abbreviation        = TSA
| motto               = "Learning to lead in a technical world."| formation           = 
| predecessor         = American Industrial Arts Student Association (AIASA)
| extinction          = 
| type                = Youth organization, Career and technical student organization
| status              = Non-profit organization
| purpose             = 
| headquarters        = Reston, Virginia
| location            = 
| region_served       = United StatesGermanyTurkeyJapan
| membership          = 250,000 students  2,300 chapters
| leader_title        = President
| main_organ          = 
| affiliations        = 
| num_staff           = 
| num_volunteers      = 
| budget              = 
| website             = TSAweb.org
| remarks             = 
}}

The Technology Student Association (TSA''') is a national student organization created to develop skills in science, technology, engineering, and mathematics (STEM) as well as business education. TSA aims to develop leadership, academic, and business management skills in the workplace among students and leaders within the community. The organization has 250,000 members.

Competition 
Competitive events are separated into middle school and high school levels, with students competing only with their respective age group. Competitions take place at the local, regional, state, and national level. A component of leadership is often entailed in events at both levels, with some events being devoted to leadership (such as Leadership Strategies MS).

All TSA competitions are correlated with national science, technology, engineering and mathematics and business standards. Sample middle school events include Biotechnology, Career Prep, Video Game Design, and Inventions and Innovations. High school events include Animatronics, Computer Aided Design (CAD), Dragster Design, Promotional Design, System Control Technology, Flight Endurance, Software Development, and Webmaster. For the 2022-2023 season Audio Podcasting, Drone Challenge (UAV), and Virtual Reality Visualization were added as high school events and the Cybersecurity event was removed.

Scores are out of 100 points and based upon a nationally developed rubric. Winners are chosen based on these scores. In many events, semi-finalists (top 12) move onto a second round of competition which usually involves an interview with the judges about the project. First, second, and third-place winners are awarded a trophy, and finalists (top 10) are recognized at the national level.

Program initiatives

The Technology Student Association has partnered with many groups to promote other skills. Junior Solar Sprint is a national program allows students to design solar-powered cars. Tests of Engineering Aptitude, Mathematics, and Science (TEAMS) is an annual one-day competition where students use their skills to solve issues facing our global society. TSA has partnered with the VEX Robotics Competition to allow students to design and create robots to complete specific tasks. UNITE is a summer program funded by the U.S. Army Research Office that encourages high school students to pursue engineering careers. Every TSA middle school and high school member is required to submit LEAP (Leadership. Education. Achievement. Personal Growth.) documentation as part of every competition in which they compete. LEAP documentation tracks the leadership activities and experiences a TSA member has completed as part of each competition.

History
TSA became an independent organization in 1978, when AIASA Inc. was formed to oversee the activities of the American Industrial Arts Student Association. Between the foundation of AIASA as an independent organization (it had formerly been a part of the American Industrial Arts Association) and 1988, the association grew and began to take shape.

In 1988, the AIASA changed its name to the Technology Student Association as part of a shift in focus from industrial arts to mainstream technology.  This action followed a similar name change by the Texas state delegation the previous year.  In 1989, the official logo, submitted by a chapter advisor, was adopted. In 1990, the logo received a trademark from the U.S. Patent and Trademark Office.

Today, the association has grown to include more than 250,000 members in more than 2,300 secondary schools across 48 states. It has established an Honor Society, manages numerous competitive events and has partnerships with several organizations. Since TSA was chartered in 1978, more than five million students have participated as members.

As part of its national service project, TSA has a partnership with the American Cancer Society (ACS). TSA members raise money to help fund research, education, advocacy and patient services provided by the ACS, and the ACS presents Spirit of Service awards to chapters that participated in fundraising.

National conferences
Students elect a National Officer team annually at the Technology Student Association national conference.

The 2022 national conference was held on June 26 - June 30 at the Gaylord Texan Resort Hotel & Convention Center in Grapevine, Texas. The 2023 national conference is scheduled to be held at the Kentucky International Convention Center in Louisville, Kentucky.

Notable alumni
Hunter Hayes - Country singer and music star, Tennessee TSA
Andy Hertzfeld - Member of the original Macintosh development team and computer entrepreneur
Chad Hurley - Co-founder of YouTube, Pennsylvania TSA
Sal Khan - Founder of Khan Academy, Louisiana TSA
Carrie Underwood - Country singer and music star, Oklahoma TSA
Mark Zuckerberg - Founder of Facebook, New York TSA

References

External links
Official TSA Website
Office of Vocational and Adult Education (USDOE)`

 
Career and technical student organizations
Honor societies
High school honor societies
Student organizations in the United States
Organizations based in Virginia
Student organizations established in 1978
Engineering education in the United States